Qozloq (also known as Kuzluk and Kūz̄ūkh) is a village in Qara Bashlu Rural District, Chapeshlu District, Dargaz County, Razavi Khorasan Province, Iran. At the 2006 census, its population was 145, in 34 families.

References 

Populated places in Dargaz County